"Sweet Release" is a song by alternative rock group Live, which was released as the second single from their 2003 album, Birds of Pray.  It was only released in Australia, where it peaked at #61 and spent 11 weeks in the ARIA top 100 singles chart.

Track listings
All songs by Ed Kowalczyk, except where noted:

Australian CD single
 "Sweet Release" – 3:04
 "Lighthouse" (Live at Vorst Nationaal) (Kowalczyk, Chad Taylor) – 3:06
 "The Beauty of Gray" (Live at Vorst Nationaal) – 4:24
 "They Stood Up for Love" (Live at Vorst Nationaal) (Kowalczyk, Patrick Dahlheimer, Taylor)– 5:03
 "Heaven" (Live at Vorst National) (Video) – 4:31

Charts

References

Live (band) songs
2003 singles
Songs written by Ed Kowalczyk
2003 songs
Radioactive Records singles